The Old Palace, also called Kaiser Wilhelm Palace (Kaiser-Wilhelm-Palais), is a former Royal Prussian residence on Unter den Linden boulevard in Mitte, the historic heart and city center of Berlin. It was built between 1834 to 1837 by order of Prince William of Prussia, who later became German Emperor William I, according to plans by Carl Ferdinand Langhans in Neoclassical style. Damaged during the Allied bombing in World War II, the Old Palace was rebuilt from 1963 to 1964 as part of the Forum Fridericianum. Since then, the listed building has been home to the Law Faculty of the Humboldt-Universität.

History
The Prussian crown prince Frederick William hired one of the most prominent architects of Germany, Karl Friedrich Schinkel, to design a memorial complex for Frederick the Great. However, after being disappointed with the expensive plans of Schinkel, he accepted the modest concept of the architect Carl Ferdinand Langhans in Neoclassical-style. As the construction of the palace was completed in 1837, the then crown prince William I began using the building as his residence until his death in 1888.
The palace was built with a pergola, a mezzanine and a vestibule.

References

Bibliography
 Helmut Engel. "Das Haus des deutschen Kaisers. Das Alte Palais Unter den Linden". Berlin: Verlagshaus Braun, 2004, .

External links
 "Humboldt-Universität-Altes Palais", history and data about the Old Palace at the official website of the city of Berlin (in German)
 Unter den Linden 9 and 11: Altes Palais and former Governor’s Building – Humboldt-Universität zu Berlin

1837 establishments in Germany
Houses completed in 1837
Buildings and structures in Mitte
Palaces in Berlin
Royal residences in Berlin
Prussian cultural sites
Rebuilt buildings and structures in Berlin
William I, German Emperor